Venetia is a feminine English given name. It may refer to:

People
Venetia Burney (1919–2009), the girl who named the planet Pluto
Venetia Dearden (born 1975), English photographer
Venetia James (1861–1948), London society hostess and racehorse breeder
Venetia Stanley (1600–1633), Elizabethan Catholic and wife of Kenelm Digby
Venetia Stanley (1887–1948), British aristocrat and socialite remembered for her 1910–15 correspondence with Prime Minister H. H. Asquith
Venetia Stevenson (born 1938), English-American actress
Venetia Williams (born 1960), British racehorse trainer

Fictional characters
Venetia Lanyon, heroine of Georgette Heyer's Regency Romance novel Venetia

English feminine given names